The New Frontiers Science Park is a science park in Essex, on a redeveloped research site of GlaxoSmithKline (GSK).

History

Construction
Planning permission for the site was granted in 1994, opening in April 1997.

SmithKline Beecham
Smith, Kline & French had been headquartered in Welwyn Garden City; it merged with Beecham Group in 1989. Smith Kline & French Research had a research site at Welwyn Garden City and another at The Frythe in rural Hertfordshire in the south of Welwyn; in the early 1980s all research was moved out of Welwyn Garden City to The Frythe.

The site was built by SmithKline Beecham, which became GSK in December 2000 when it merged with Glaxo Wellcome. The site was the UK headquarters of SmithKline Beecham; Glaxo had a takeover of Wellcome in 1995. SmithKline Beecham employed 47,000 staff around the world, with 8,200 in the UK. Jan Leschly (a Danish tennis player) was chief executive of SmithKline Beecham from 1994 to 2000. SmithKline Beecham exported £1.2bn of products. In 1998 SmithKline Beecham spent £910m on research, with £330m of that in the UK.

Beecham Pharmaceuticals previously had its Medicinal Research Centre on the site., where it worked on hypertension and gastrointestinal disease.

The site was visited by the Princess Royal on the afternoon of 3 February 2000, following on in the morning from attending a meeting about the new Basic Skills Agency.

GSK
SmithKline Beecham became GSK. After the merger, a possibility was that the Harlow site would close or Glaxo Wellcome's Glaxo Research Campus in Stevenage would close; at the time of its construction in the early 1990s, Glaxo Stevenage was the largest single construction site in the UK. At the time of the merger, the USA was accounting for 45% of GSK's sales, with 33% in Europe, and 22% in the rest of the world. The company would be the world's largest pharmaceutical company with a market capitalisation of £114bn. GSK was the largest private sector funder of research in the UK.

2012 Summer Olympics

The site was the Official Laboratory Services Provider for the 2012 Summer Olympics; every medallist and 50% of competitors were tested by GSK there. 150 scientists from King's College London and the World Anti-Doping Agency would be there, to take around 6,000 samples. 240 prohibited substances would be tested for, with about 400 samples per day. By April 2017, 29 medals had been stripped from competitors in the 2012 Olympics, with 13 of these from Russia.

Public Health England
Since 2010, the Health Protection Agency had wanted to move scientific staff to the GSK site in Essex. GSK had proposed to move from the site in February 2010.

Public Health England bought the site on 7 July 2017 for £25m. Staff will move to the site in 2021, and it will be fully operational by 2024. PHE is headed by Duncan Selbie.

Structure
It is situated in Essex on the A1169, over which the site has a footbridge.

Heads of site
 Jackie Hunter CBE

See also
 Alderley Park, former site of ICI, later AstraZeneca
 BioCity Nottingham
 Lilly Research Centre

References

External links
 Public Health England

1997 establishments in England
Buildings and structures in Harlow
GSK plc
Health in Essex
Industrial buildings completed in 1997
Neuroscience research centres in the United Kingdom
Pharmaceutical industry in the United Kingdom
Pharmaceutical research institutes
Public Health England
Science and technology in Essex
Science parks in the United Kingdom
Sports medicine in the United Kingdom